Yahballaha, sometimes spelled as Yaballaha, is a Syriac masculine given name meaning "God has given". Notable people named Yahballaha include:

 Yahballaha I, patriarch of the Church of the East from 415 to 420
 Yahballaha II, patriarch of the Church of the East from 1190 to 1222
 Yahballaha III (1245–1317), patriarch of the Church of the East from 1281 to 1317
 Yahballaha IV (died 1580), patriarch of the Chaldean Catholic Church from 1572 to 1580
 Yahballaha V (disambiguation)

Notes

References

Journals 

 

Syriac masculine given names